Beaverlodge Lake is a remote lake in northern Saskatchewan, Canada, located east of Uranium City. Road access is provided by Saskatchewan Highway 962.

The former Eldorado town site is on the lake and there has been extensive uranium exploration in the surrounding area.

Islands
A number of islands are located in the lake, including:
 Hofer Island
 Lenz Island
 Todd Island
 Umisk Island

See also 
List of lakes of Saskatchewan

References

Lakes of Saskatchewan